Simply K-Pop (also known as Simply K-pop Con-Tour or Simply Con-tour) is a South Korean music television program broadcast by Arirang TV. Originally called The M-Wave, the show's title was changed to Wave K in 2011, and renamed again in 2012 to Simply K-Pop. It airs live worldwide every Friday at 13:00PM KST, and is broadcast from Arirang Tower in Seocho-dong, Seoul.

Currently hosted by Lee Dae-hwi of AB6IX, the show features K-pop stars who perform on stage and interact with the audience throughout each episode. It is additionally available for online streaming via Viki with multilingual subtitles—it was previously available on DramaFever until the site shut down in 2018. Reruns of the show air on the free Philippine digital TV channel Hallypop every Sunday at 6:30 PM.

Since April 19, 2021, on the Mondays of each two weeks, Simply K-pop is airing Simply K-pop Con-Tour to "travel" to each country. This is livestreamed in Youtube. Simply K-pop is now also known as Simply K-pop Con-Tour.

Simply K-Pop Awards

Similar programs 
SBS Inkigayo
KBS Music Bank
MBC Show! Music Core
Mnet M Countdown
Arirang TV Pops in Seoul
JTBC Music Universe K-909
MBC M Show Champion
SBS M The Show

See also 
Music programs of South Korea

References

External links 
Simply K-Pop Official website

South Korean music television shows
2000s South Korean television series